The H-1 Doodle Bug is a single place homebuilt aircraft designed in the 1950s by Continental Airlines DC-6 pilot Lawrence K. Heuberger.

Design and development

The prototype was designed and built in Heuberger's garage in El Paso. Heuberger marketed plans of the aircraft for homebuilt construction.

The Doodlebug is a low wing, conventional geared aircraft. The wings are partially flush riveted. The fuselage is fabric covered welded steel tube, with wooden stringers. The firewall mounted fuel tank holds 12.5 gallons of fuel, with 25 gallons capacity with tip tanks.

Specifications (Heuberger Doodle Bug)

See also

References

Homebuilt aircraft